Mesosiderites are a class of stony–iron meteorites consisting of about equal parts of metallic nickel-iron and silicate. They are breccias with an irregular texture; silicates and metal occur often in lumps or pebbles as well as in fine-grained intergrowths. The silicate part contains olivine, pyroxenes, and Ca-rich feldspar and is similar in composition to eucrites and diogenites.

They are a rare type of meteorite; as of November 2014 only 208 are known (of which 56 come from Antarctica) and only 7 of these are observed falls. On the other hand, some mesosiderites are among the largest meteorites known.

At Vaca Muerta in the Atacama Desert in Chile, many fragments with a total mass of 3.8 tons were found in a large strewnfield. They were first discovered in the 19th century by ore prospectors who mistook the shiny metal inclusions for silver and thought they had found an outcrop of a silver ore deposit. Later when an analysis was made and nickel-iron was found, the true nature as a meteorite was established. The meteorite was called Vaca Muerta. The picture at right shows a cut and polished piece of Vaca Muerta.

The most recent fall of a mesosiderite occurred at Dong Ujimqin Qi in China, on September 7, 1995, where three large pieces with a total mass of  fell. The fall of the Estherville mesosiderite in Iowa, US occurred on May 10, 1879. After a brilliant fireball had been seen, a shower of several large masses and many small fragments fell, totaling . The other observed mesosiderite falls occurred in 1842 at Barea (Spain), in 1880 at Varamin (Iran), in 1933 at Dyarrl Island (Papua New Guinea), and at Patwar (India) in 1935.
The legendary Chinguetti meteorite is also supposed to be a mesosiderite.

The asteroid 16 Psyche is a candidate for the parent body of the mesosiderites.

See also
 Glossary of meteoritics

References

External links

 Mesosiderite images from Northern Arizona University
 Mesosiderite images from Meteorites Australia